David Souter (born 1939) is an American jurist who served as an associate justice of the United States Supreme Court from 1990 to 2009.

David Souter or Dave Souter may also refer to:

Dave Soutar, (born 1940), ten-pin bowler
Dave Souter (1940–2020), Scottish footballer
David Henry Souter (1862–1935), Australian artist

See also
David Suter (artist), (born 1949), American artist
David Suter (biologist), (born 1978), Swiss biologist